The list of shipwrecks in June 1882 includes ships sunk, foundered, grounded, or otherwise lost during June 1882.

1 June

2 June

3 June

5 June

6 June

7 June

9 June

10 June

11 June

12 June

13 June

15 June

16 June

17 June

19 June

21 June

23 June

28 June

29 June

30 June

Unknown date

References

1882-06
Maritime incidents in June 1882